A number of French ships have borne the name Mont-Blanc, in honour of the Mont-Blanc mountain. Among them,

 The ship of the line 
 The civilian cargo ship  (1899)  of the Compagnie Générale Transatlantique, which when carrying ammunition during World War I blew up in the Halifax Explosion of 1917.

French Navy ship names